Astragalus cedreti (also called Cedar astragalus) is a species of flowering plant in the legume family. It is a perennial plant with alternating, smooth pinnate leaves and red flowers. It blooms in June.

Description 
Astragalus cedreti grows close to the ground. The leaves are pinnately-divided into 20 to 25 leaflets having a smooth contour. The fruit is a very hirsute pod with yellowish hairs.

Distribution and habitat 
The Cedar astragalus is endemic to the mountains of Mount-Lebanon.

References 

cedreti
Taxa named by Pierre Edmond Boissier